HC Dynamo Moscow is a Russian professional ice hockey club based in Moscow. It is a member of the Tarasov Division in the Kontinental Hockey League.

Dynamo has won the Gagarin Cup twice, in 2011–12 and 2012–13 seasons, and have won the regular season championship once, in 2013–14, winning the Continental Cup.

The club is one of the most successful teams in Russia.

History
The team was founded in 1946 and belonged the Dynamo Moscow sports club, a part of Dynamo sports society sponsored by the Soviet Ministry of Interior and the national security structures including the KGB. It won the first Soviet hockey championship in 1946–47, beating Spartak Moscow in the finals. Helmed by Arkady Chernyshev during the first decades of its history, Dynamo established itself as one of the top teams of the Soviet hockey league. Throughout the Soviet era, Dynamo was among the top three teams almost every season, winning five championships and three USSR Cups. The last years of the Soviet hockey championship and the beginning of the IHL period were marked with Dynamo winning fours seasons in a row and ending CSKA Moscow's dominance that had lasted for decades.

Merger with HC MVD
In 2010, Dynamo Moscow merged with HC MVD, a KHL team from Balashikha owned by the Ministry of Internal Affairs (MVD). The team continued the history of the Dynamo club, with the majority of its roster and executives from HC MVD. The new club was officially called United Hockey Club (UHC) Dynamo Moscow, and for one season the new club was referred to as UHC Dynamo, then for a couple years as UHC Dynamo Moscow, but in 2012 the official name of the club was reverted to Hockey Club Dynamo Moscow.

In 2013 Dynamo Moscow had tried to recruit Alexander Ovechkin who played for them from 2001 to 2005, but switched to the Washington Capitals soon after.

Debt problems/KHL sanctions
Under the guidance of director and president, Andrei Safronov, HC Dynamo was reported to have amassed a debt of 2 billion rubles (US$33 million) following the 2016–17 season. With concerns from the governing body of the KHL, Dynamo were ordered to give a presentation as to how they would be funded in the following season on 24 May 2017.

As a branch of the Dynamo Moscow sporting club, the parent company board opted to remove Safronov, citing a breach of trust with sponsors and took control of the hockey club. Dynamo then refused to pay back the debt, citing it wasn't their responsibility, putting the onus on former CEO Safronov to repay the debt due to his mismanagement. With allegations of embezzlement, HC Dynamo's offices were raided by police in order to retrieve accounting documentation on 2 June 2017. With the players having not been paid in three months, former HC Dynamo board led by Safronov declared bankruptcy in order to escape the debt.

On 4 July 2017, at a KHL board meeting, the Disciplinary Committee took action with Dynamo's failure to meet contractual obligations by declaring all 42 players under contract with Dynamo as free agents.

Honours

Domestic competitions
 Soviet League Championship (5): 1946–47, 1953–54, 1989–90, 1990–91, 1991–92

 USSR Cup (3): 1953, 1972, 1976

 IHL Championship (3): 1992–93, 1994–95, 1995–96

 IHL Cup (3): 1993, 1995, 1996

 Russian Superleague (2): 1999–00, 2004–05

Kontinental Hockey League

 Gagarin Cup (2): 2011–12, 2012–13

 Continental Cup (1): 2013–14

 Opening Cup (3): 2010–11, 2012–13, 2013–14

Europe
 IIHF European Champions Cup (1): 2006

 IIHF Continental Cup (1): 2004–05

 Spengler Cup (2): 1983, 2008

 Lugano Cup (1): 1991

 Ahearne Cup (2): 1975, 1976

 Tampere Cup (2): 1991, 1992

Season-by-season KHL record

Note: GP = Games played, W = Wins, L = Losses, T = Ties, OTL = Overtime/shootout losses, Pts = Points, GF = Goals for, GA = Goals against

Players

Current roster

IIHF Hall-of-Famers

Players
Aleksandr Maltsev, LW, 1967–84, inducted 1999
Vladimir Yurzinov, C, 1957–72, inducted 2002
Valeri Vasiliev, D, 1967–84, inducted 1998
Builders
Arkady Chernyshev, Coach, 1946–74, inducted 1999
Vladimir Yurzinov, Coach, 1974–79, 1989–92 inducted 2002

Honoured members

Dynamo Moscow has honoured 25 players and one coach in its history.

Notes
 1 Russian clubs tend to hang a banner of honour with a player's jersey number (sometimes multiple players per number), while still keeping the number in circulation.

Head coaches

Arkady Chernyshev, 1946–74
Vladimir Yurzinov, 1974–79
Vitaly Davydov, 1979–81
Vladimir Kiselev, 1981–83
Igor Tuzik, 1983–84
Yuri Moiseev, 1984–89
Vladimir Yurzinov, 1989–92
Petr Vorobiev, 1992–93
Igor Tuzik, 1993–94
Vladimir Golubović, 1994–96
Yuri Ochnev, 1996–97
Alexander Volchkov, 1996–98
Zinetula Bilyaletdinov, 1997–00
Vladimir Semenov, 2000–02
Zinetula Bilyaletdinov, 2002–04
Vladimir Krikunov, 2004–07
Vladimir Vůjtek, 2007–09
Sergei Kotov, 2009
Andrei Khomutov, 2009–10
Oleg Znarok, 2010–14
Harijs Vītoliņš, 2014–15
Sergei Oreshkin, 2015–17
Vladimir Vorobiev, 2017–18
Vladimir Krikunov, 2018–21
Alexei Kudashov, 2021–

Franchise records
Most championship titles: Igor Dorofeyev, 5
Most games, career: Sergei Vyshedkevich, 657
Most points, career: Alexander Maltsev, 633
Most goals, career: Alexander Maltsev, 329
Most assists, career: Alexander Maltsev, 304
Most penalty minutes, career: Sergei Vyshedkevich, 745
Most points, season: Vadim Shipachyov, 68
Most goals, season: Alexander Maltsev, 36
Most assists, season: Vadim Shipachyov, 48
Most penalty minutes, season: Petr Čajánek, 123
Most goals, game: Alexander Uvarov, 6
Most assists, game: Sergey Yashin, 4
Most penalty minutes, game: Alexander Zhurik, 34
Fastest goal from start of a game: Alexei Kalyuzhny, 0:08

See also
Dynamo Sports Club

References

External links
  
 History of HC Dynamo Moscow 

 
Ice hockey teams in Russia
Ice hockey clubs established in 1946
Kontinental Hockey League teams
Ice hockey